Paracombe is a small town near Adelaide, South Australia. At the 2011 census, Paracombe had a population of 343.

Geography 
Paracombe is located south of Inglewood on the road out of Adelaide via Athelstone (Gorge Road).

History 

The name probably originates from the Little Para River whose headwaters are in the area. It was settled in 1840–41 by John Barton Hack and John Richardson, and was a sheep station until the beginning of the 20th century. It was subdivided and, with an influx of smaller landholders, a school, post office, church and recreation hall were built, but the town did not grow much beyond this.

In 1966, work started on the Kangaroo Creek Reservoir, a dam of the River Torrens, and in 1969 it was completed at a cost of $5.3 million. Apart from supplying water to eastern Adelaide, it also serves a flood protection role and holds 19,160 megalitres.

Facilities 
Paracombe has a primary school, a recreation centre and a Country Fire Station.

Transport 
The area is not serviced by Adelaide Metro public transport. A coach is operated from Tea Tree Plaza Interchange to Gumeracha and Mount Pleasant by LinkSA.

References 

Towns in South Australia